St. Joseph Sound is a body of water on the Gulf of Mexico coast of Pasco and Pinellas counties. The sound lies between the mainland and Anclote Key, Three Rooker Island, and Honeymoon Island, from the north end of Anclote Key to the Dunedin Causeway. The Anclote River feeds into St. Joseph Sound.

References

Bodies of water of Pasco County, Florida
Bodies of water of Pinellas County, Florida
Bays of Florida on the Gulf of Mexico